Kołodziej is a Polish surname meaning "wheelwright". Notable people with the surname include:
 Dariusz Kołodziej (born 1982), Polish footballer
 Janusz A. Kołodziej (born 1959), Polish politician
 Janusz Kołodziej (born 1984), Polish speedway rider
 Miriam Kolodziejová (born 1997), Czech tennis player
 Paweł Kołodziej (born 1980), Polish boxer
 Piast Kołodziej (c. 740–861 AD), Polish semi-legendary figure
 Ross Kolodziej (born 1978), American football player
 Władysław Kołodziej (1897–1978), pioneer of modern Paganism in Poland

See also
 

Polish-language surnames
Occupational surnames